Greene Township is located in Woodford County, Illinois at T27N, R1E. As of the 2010 census, its population was 483 and it contained 164 housing units.

Geography

Demographics

References

External links
City-data.com
Illinois State Archives

Townships in Woodford County, Illinois
Peoria metropolitan area, Illinois
Townships in Illinois